Oaken Palace Records is an independent record label based in Birmingham, England. The label is a registered charity and 100% of the profits are donated to organisations supporting endangered species.

Each release is dedicated to an endangered species of the artists choosing and all of the profits from the release are donated to an organisation dedicated to helping that species. The records are produced as environmentally-friendly as possible: the sleeves are made of 100% recycled cardboard, printed with non-toxic inks, and with carbon neutral record pressing. As of June 2016 they have raised over £5,200.

Catalogue

References

External links
 Oaken Palace Records official website
 

British independent record labels
Electronic music record labels
Environmental charities based in the United Kingdom
Record labels based in Birmingham, West Midlands
Record labels established in 2012